Backfield in Motion is a 1991 American comedy film directed by Richard Michaels and written by Gene O'Neill, Noreen Tobin and Janet Brownell. The film stars Roseanne Barr, Tom Arnold, Colleen Camp, Conchata Ferrell, Carolyn Mignini and Johnny Galecki. The film premiered on ABC on November 13, 1991.

Plot

Roseanne Barr plays a widowed mother/real estate agent who moves to an upstate California town so obsessed with football that she organizes a "mothers-versus-sons" football game.

Cast 
Roseanne Barr as Nancy Seavers 
Tom Arnold as Howard Peterman
Colleen Camp as Laurie
Conchata Ferrell as Ann Bedowski
Carolyn Mignini as Sheila
Johnny Galecki as Tim Seavers
Kevin Scannell as Joe Dooley Sr.
Olivia Burnette as Betsy Dooley
Mike Pniewski as Jimmy Cox
Loyda Ramos as Sally
Jayne Modean as Faith
Brandon Crane as Andy
Robert Noble as Harry
Sean Murray as Joe Jr.
Scott Ferguson as Boz
Teresa Ganzel as Joanne
Jessie Jones as Ms. Marsh
Danny Gonzalez as Derek
Patrick LaBrecque as Freddie
Scott Wilkinson as Ray
Alexander Folk as Mr. Brooks

References

External links
 

1991 films
1991 television films
Films scored by Cliff Eidelman
American comedy films
1991 comedy films
1990s English-language films
Films directed by Richard Michaels
1990s American films